Alonso Orozco Enriquez de Armendáriz Castellanos y Toledo, O. de M. (1551 – 5 December 1628) was a Roman Catholic prelate who served as Bishop of Michoacán (1624–1628), Bishop of Santiago de Cuba (1610–1624), and Auxiliary Bishop of Burgos (1605–1610).

Biography
Alonso Orozco Enriquez de Armendáriz Castellanos y Toledo was born in Sevilla, Spain and ordained a priest in the Order of Our Lady of Mercy on 17 April 1566.
On 27 June 1605, he was appointed by the King of Spain and confirmed by Pope Paul V as Auxiliary Bishop of Burgos and Titular Bishop of Sidon. On 11 September 1605, he was consecrated bishop by Alfonso Manrique, Archbishop of Burgos. On 30 August 1610, he was appointed by Pope Paul V as Bishop of Santiago de Cuba and installed on 9 September 1611. On 15 April 1624, he was appointed by Pope Paul V as Bishop of Michoacán where he served until his death on 5 December 1628. While bishop, he was the principal consecrator of Francisco de Manso Zuñiga y Sola, Bishop of México.

References

External links and additional sources
 (for Chronology of Bishops) 
 (for Chronology of Bishops) 
 (for Chronology of Bishops) 
 (for Chronology of Bishops) 
 (for Chronology of Bishops)  
 (for Chronology of Bishops) 
 (for Chronology of Bishops) 
 (for Chronology of Bishops) 

1628 deaths
17th-century Roman Catholic bishops in Cuba
Bishops appointed by Pope Paul V
1551 births
People from Seville
Mercedarian bishops
Roman Catholic bishops of Santiago de Cuba